= Camping World 300 =

Camping World 300 can refer to:

- Camping World 300 (Chicagoland), a NASCAR race in Joliet, Illinois
- Camping World 300 (Daytona) a NASCAR Nationwide Series race held at Daytona International Speedway
- Camping World 300 (Fontana), a NASCAR Nationwide Series race held at Auto Club Speedway
